The list of ship launches in 1924 includes a chronological list of some ships launched in 1924.

References 

Sources

1924
1924 in transport